Miiko (written: 美以子 or 美位子) is a feminine Japanese given name. Notable people with the name include:

, Japanese gravure idol and actress
, Japanese American actress

Other people
Miiko Albornoz (born 1990), Swedish footballer
Miiko Hintz (born 1992), Finnish ice hockey player

Japanese feminine given names